St. Anne's Church is a ruined church in Derviçan, Gjirokastër County, Albania. It is a Cultural Monument of Albania.

References

Cultural Monuments of Albania
Buildings and structures in Dropull
Church ruins in Albania